Lewis Fitz-Gerald (born 15 November 1958) is an Australian actor, screenwriter and television director, who lectures in Screen and Media Studies at Australia's University of New England.

Filmography

As actor 

 Breaker Morant (1980) – Lt. George Witton
 The Last Outlaw (1980, TV mini-series) – Tom Lloyd
 I Can Jump Puddles (1981, TV series) – Alan Marshall / Narrator
 Outbreak of Love (1981, TV series) – Alan Marshall / Narrator
 We of the Never Never (1982) – Jack
 Fighting Back (1982) – John Embling
 The Dean Case (1982, TV movie) – George Dean
 The Boy Who Had Everything (1984) – Vandervelt
 The Flying Doctors (1985–1986, TV series) – David 'Gibbo' Gibson
 The More Things Change... (1986) – Barry
 The Shiralee (1987, TV mini-series) – Tony
 Warm Nights on a Slow Moving Train (1988) – Brian
 Rikky and Pete (1988) – Adam
 Evil Angels (1988) – Tipple
 The Four Minute Mile (1988, TV movie) – Denis Johannson
 Police State (1989, TV movie) – Gary Crooke
 R.F.D.S. (1993, TV series) – Dr. Sebert Blitho
 Spider & Rose (1994) – Robert Dougherty
 Dead Heart (1996) – Les
 The Adventures of Sam (1997, TV series) – Captain Billy Branscombe (voice)
 Pitch Black (2000) – Paris P. Ogilvie
 The Three Stooges (2000, TV movie) – Jules White
 Border Patrol (2001, TV movie) – Dr. Roderick Helms
 The Mystery of Natalie Wood (2004, TV series) – Dr. Thayer
 The Boys Are Back (2009) – Tim Walker
 Home and Away (2010, TV series) – Snr Detective Gordon Eaves
 Crownies (2011) – David Sinclair, SC
 Not Suitable for Children (2012) – Dr. McKenzie
 The Wolverine (2013) – Attorney #1 (uncredited)
 Janet King (2014) – David Sinclair, SC
 Truth (2015) – Louis Boccardi
 Hunters (2016, TV series) – Truss Jackson
 Rake (2016, TV series) – Mandel
 Dance Academy: The Movie (2017) – ICU Dr Kelly
 Pimped (2018) – Michael Hanson
 Harmony (2018) – Mr. Lenox
 Pine Gap (2018, TV mini-series) – Rudi Fox
 Thirteen Lives (2022) – Vernon Unsworth

Director 
 Twisted Tales (1996, TV series)
 Water Rats (1996, TV series)
 McLeod's Daughters (2001, TV series)
 Home and Away (2006, TV series)
 Out of the Blue (2008, TV series)

Independent work 
 The Last Man Hanged (1993 film) (Writer, actor, director)

See also
 List of University of New England (Australia) people

References

External links 
 

1958 births
Australian male film actors
Living people
Male actors from Adelaide
National Institute of Dramatic Art alumni
Academic staff of the University of New England (Australia)
20th-century Australian male actors
21st-century Australian male actors